1 Samuel 2 is the second chapter of the Books of Samuel in the Hebrew Bible (or the "First Book of Samuel" in the Christian Bible). It recounts the Song of Hannah, the corruption of the priests descended from Eli, Samuel's ministry to God 'even as a child' and the prophecy of a "man of God" against Eli's household.

Text 
The original text of this chapter, as with the rest of the Books of Samuel, was written in Hebrew. Since the division of the Bible into chapters in the late medieval period, this chapter is divided into 36 verses.

Textual witnesses
Some early manuscripts containing the text of this chapter in Hebrew are of the Masoretic Text tradition, which includes the Codex Cairensis (895), Aleppo Codex (10th century), and Codex Leningradensis (1008). Fragments containing parts of this chapter in Hebrew were found among the Dead Sea Scrolls including 4Q51 (4QSam; 100–50 BCE) with extant verses 1–10, 16–36.

There is also a difference into Koine Greek known as the Septuagint, made in the last few centuries BCE. Extant ancient manuscripts of the Septuagint version include Codex Vaticanus (B; B; 4th century) and Codex Alexandrinus (A; A; 5th century).

Period 
 The event in this chapter happened at the end of judges period in Israel, about 1100 BC.

Structure 
The New Revised Standard Version organises this chapter as follows:
  = Hannah's Prayer
  = Eli’s Wicked Sons
  = The Child Samuel at Shiloh
  = Prophecy Against Eli’s Household

Prophecy against Eli's household
Verses 22 to 25 introduce a topic dealing with the condemnation of the house of Eli on account of his sons' transgressions. The Masoretic Text of the Hebrew Bible, Targum, and Vulgate translation refer to Hophni and Phinehas' sins including both the misappropriation of food brought to sacrifice at the shrine in Shiloh and also their sexual relations with "the women who assembled at the door of the tabernacle of meeting". The Septuagint and the Dead Sea Scrolls omit the latter issue.

Eli hears of his sons' behaviour and challenges them to reform, but they take no account of his pleading. Then a "man of God" comes to Eli, a prophet of whom, says Donald Spence Jones, "we know nothing".

See also
Hophni and Phinehas

Notes

References

Bibliography

Commentaries on Samuel 

 Shmuel I – Samuel I (Judaica Press) translation [with Rashi's commentary] at Chabad.org

General

External links 

Masoretic Text
 שמואל א Shmuel Aleph – Samuel A (Hebrew – English at Mechon-Mamre.org)

Jewish translations
 1 Samuel at Mechon-Mamre (Jewish Publication Society translation)

Christian translations
 
Samuel 1 at Bible Gateway

Related articles
 Introduction to the book of 1 Samuel from the NIV Study Bible

02